Peter Gregson (born 1987) is a cellist and composer.

Gregson composed the score for the 2015 film A Little Chaos, marking his first major film scoring job. Richard Lawson of Vanity Fair named it his favourite score of the year, dubbing it "a string-heavy stunner", though Dennis Harvey writing for Variety magazine described it as "clichéd, saccharine score". Gregson was interviewed as part of BBC Radio Ulster's Classical Connections with John Toal programme in May 2015.

Recordings

 
 
 
 
 
 
  
2021: An Evening at Capitol Studios: Bach Recomposed - EP

References

External links
 Peter Gregson website

1987 births
Living people
British cellists
21st-century British composers
21st-century cellists
Deutsche Grammophon artists